State Highway 18 (SH 18) is a state highway that runs between the Auckland Northern Motorway (SH 1) on the North Shore and the Northwestern Motorway (SH 16) in West Auckland, New Zealand. The Upper Harbour Motorway forms most of its length as of 2016 (the exception being a two-kilometre stretch at the north-eastern end). SH 18 forms the northern part of the Western Ring Route, which continues from Waitakere south-east to Manukau.

Route
SH 18 begins at the Auckland Northern Motorway and runs southwest as a dual carriageway road, and is coextensive with the Upper Harbour Highway, which after two kilometres becomes a motorway at the Albany Highway interchange. This four-lane section of motorway opened in December 2007, and bypassed the single carriageway Upper Harbour Drive. The motorway heads south-west, crossing the upper reaches of the Waitematā Harbour over the Upper Harbour Bridge. At Squadron Drive, the highway extends onto a new section of motorway, which opened in August 2011, bypassing Hobsonville Road.  This road cuts across in a southwestern direction across farmland to Westgate, where it turns southward and merges with the Northwestern Motorway southbound.

Interchanges

Former route
SH 18 formerly ran along the Coatesville Riverhead Highway, further north than its current position. This route is now designated as Auckland Urban Route 28.

Cycleway 
The route of the new motorway from Upper Harbour Bridge to Westgate was originally to receive a cycleway as well, but although the land was set aside, there is no timetable for the construction of the route.

See also
List of New Zealand state highways

References

External links
 New Zealand Transport Agency

18
Transport in the Auckland Region